The 1994 Western Michigan Broncos football team represented Western Michigan University in the Mid-American Conference (MAC) during the 1994 NCAA Division I-A football season.  In their eighth season under head coach Al Molde, the Broncos compiled a 7–4 record (5–4 against MAC opponents), finished in a tie for third place in the MAC, and outscored their opponents, 274 to 189.  The team played its home games at Waldo Stadium in Kalamazoo, Michigan.

The team's statistical leaders included Jay McDonagh with 2,136 passing yards, Jim Vackaro with 910 rushing yards, and Andre Wallace with 758 receiving yards.

Schedule

References

Western Michigan
Western Michigan Broncos football seasons
Western Michigan Broncos football